The yellow-fronted parrot (Poicephalus flavifrons) is a parrot endemic to the Ethiopian Highlands. It is a mostly green with a yellow head.  Relatively little is known about this bird.

Taxonomy
German naturalist Eduard Rüppell first described the yellow-fronted parrot in 1845. Its species name is derived from the Latin words flavus "yellow", and frons "forehead". It is also known as the yellow-faced parrot. Most recent authorities treat it as monotypic, but some recognized two slightly different subspecies, P. f. flavifrons and P. f.  aurantiiceps.

Description

The face is orange-yellow. When two subspecies are recognized, the nominate is believed to have yellow to its head and face, while in P. f. aurantiiceps some of the yellow is replaced with orange. The upper beak is brownish-grey and the lower beak is bone coloured, the irises are orange-red, and bare eye-rings and cere are grey. Male and female adults have identical external appearance. Juveniles are duller than the adults with a mostly grey head, brown irises, and only a small amount of yellow on the front of the face including on the forehead.

Range
When two subspecies are recognized, the nominate is found in the highlands around Lake Tana and also in central Ethiopia, and P. f. aurantiiceps is found in southwestern Ethiopia. It lives in forest habitats, unlike most other Poicephalus parrots apart from the Cape and red-fronted parrot superspecies complex.

Aviculture
The yellow-fronted parrot was unknown in aviculture until recently. They appeared in some Slovakian collections and have bred well in captivity.  They can now be found in several European countries. Both subspecies are represented.

References

Cited texts
 

yellow-fronted parrot
Endemic birds of Ethiopia
Fauna of the Ethiopian Highlands
yellow-fronted parrot